John Alexander Wilson "Jock" Gunn  (1937 – March 7, 2023) was a Canadian political philosopher.

Early life and education 
Gunn earned a Bachelor of Arts in politics and history from Queen's University in 1959 and a Doctor of Philosophy degree from the University of Oxford.

Academic career 
Appointed full professor in 1970 at Queen's University, he was head of department 1975 to 1983 and was elected to the Royal Society of Canada in 1983. In 2001, Gunn retired after forty years of service to the university; he was then named the Sir Edward Peacock Professor Emeritus in the Queen's University Department of Political Studies.

His main academic interests included:
 History of thought (chiefly British and French)
 Social-science theories
 Political philosophy

Death
Gunn died on March 7, 2023, at the age of 85.

Selected bibliography 
 Politics and the Public Interest in the Seventeenth Century (Routledge and Kegan Paul, 1969).
 Beyond Liberty and Property: The Process of Self-Recognition in Eighteenth-Century Political Thought (McGill-Queen's University Press, 1983).
 When the French Tried to Be British: Party, Opposition, and the Quest for Civil Disagreement, 1814–1848 (McGill-Queen's University Press, 2009).

References

1937 births
2023 deaths
Academic staff of the Queen's University at Kingston
Fellows of the Royal Society of Canada
Canadian political philosophers
20th-century Canadian male writers
21st-century Canadian male writers
20th-century Canadian philosophers
21st-century Canadian philosophers
Alumni of the University of Oxford